The Tianma Tea House is a former tea house in Datong District, Taipei, Taiwan. It is the site where an enforcement officer from the Taiwan Tobacco and Wine Monopoly Bureau of the Taiwan Provincial Government accidentally shot a civilian on 27 February 1947. The incident led to the island-wide anti-government uprising by the Taiwanese people called the February 28 Incident and the implementation of White Terror in Taiwan from 1949 to 1987.

The tea house building has long been on the route of the annual march to commemorate the February 28 Incident in Taipei by government officials or civilians.

History
The tea house was originally opened by a famous orator and lyricist Zhan Tianma shortly after 1934. It was closed down after the February 28 Incident in 1947.

Transportation
The building is accessible within walking distance west from Zhongshan Station of Taipei Metro.

See also
 February 28 Incident
 List of tourist attractions in Taiwan

References

February 28 incident
Buildings and structures in Taipei
Tea houses